Knockabout may refer to:

Cape Cod Knockabout, a type of boat
Knockabout (film), a 1979 Hong Kong martial arts film
Knockabout Comics, a comic publisher